Valdemar III Abelsøn (died 1257) was Duke of Schleswig from 1253 until his death in 1257. He was the eldest son of King Abel of Denmark, Duke of Schleswig and Matilda of Holstein.

Life
At the time of his father's death in 1252, Valdemar was being held prisoner in the Archbishopric of Cologne, the hostage of the Prince-Archbishop. Thus unable to claim the throne of Denmark, his father's younger brother Christopher I was elected king.

However, his mother's relatives, the counts of Holstein were able to obtain his release and supported his claim to the Duchy of Schleswig. In 1253 Christopher I had to relinquish his opposition and created him Duke.

The following years Valdemar spent fighting his uncle, King Christopher. Valdemar died in 1257. He was succeeded as duke by his younger brother, Eric I.

Ancestry

References
Biography in Dansk Biografisk Leksikon 1. ed.

Dukes of Schleswig
House of Estridsen
1257 deaths
Year of birth unknown
Heirs apparent who never acceded
Sons of kings